Pop culture fiction is a genre of fiction where stories are written intentionally to be filled with references from other works and media. Stories in this genre are focused solely on using popular culture references.

Criteria
Some works in the genre use pop culture references to elicit nostalgia among its consumers, while other examples have the whole setting and universe themselves built upon and revolves around pop cultural references.

Many types of modern-day homage, metafiction, satires and parodies fall under this category. Many stories inspired by games and geek culture have also been examples. According to author Gary Westfahl, works under this genre demand an "aura of immaturity, of incompleteness, while projecting no pretenses."

This genre should not be confused with Pop culture non-fiction, which are researches, encyclopedias, and other academic works focused on the study and analysis of pop culture, rather than stories centered around pop culture references.

Examples

Notable pop culture fiction books
Bret Easton Ellis's American Psycho (both the book and film) became one of the earliest examples of this genre with its endless use of brands and criticism on business and mindless consumerism. 
Ernest Cline's Ready Player One (both book and film) which extensively use 1980s pop culture as its themes.
Louis Bulaong's Escapist Dream and its sequel Otaku Girl, are novels that genre-busts popular geek culture and topics into one virtual reality story.
Chris Fox's The Dark Lord Bert is a Dungeons & Dragons-inspired gamelit filled with pop culture references.

List of pop culture fiction authors
Bret Easton Ellis
Ernest Cline
Louis Bulaong
Chris Fox

Notable pop culture fiction films
Jean-Luc Godard's Band of Outsiders (1964) was influenced by Golden Age B-movie film noirs and Westerns
Blazing Saddles (1974)
Phantom of the Paradise (1974)
Young Frankenstein (1974)
Monty Python and the Holy Grail (1975) satirizing epic cinema
Life of Brian (1979) satirized Biblical epic cinema
Airplane! (1980)
Spaceballs (1987)
Who Framed Roger Rabbit (1988)
Army of Darkness (1992)
True Romance (1993)
Clerks (1994)
Pulp Fiction (1994), the critically beloved Cannes-winning multi-genre film that drew numerous aspects of popular culture.
Scream (1996)
Swingers (1996)
Ghost Dog: The Way of the Samurai (1999), the hip-hop gangster film infusing Japanese warrior culture with influences of filmmakers Jean-Pierre Melville and Seijun Suzuki.
Galaxy Quest (1999)
Scary Movie series (2000-2013)
The Three Flavours Cornetto trilogy (2004-2013)
The Editor (2014)
Guardians of the Galaxy (2014)
The aforementioned American Psycho (2000) and Ready Player One (2018)
Spider-Man: Into the Spider-Verse (2018)
Space Jam: A New Legacy (2021)
Chip 'n Dale: Rescue Rangers (2022)
Animated franchises, such as Wreck-It Ralph, Hotel Transylvania, Shrek, The Lego Movie and Toy Story

List of pop culture fiction filmmakers
Mel Brooks
Quentin Tarantino
Richard Linklater
Edgar Wright
Kevin Smith

List of pop culture fiction in comic format
Scott Pilgrim which used various 1980s gaming references.
Warren Ellis's Planetary.
Outside of Western media, works such as Hayate The Combat Butler and Gin Tama have also become famous examples.

See also
Pop art
Postmodernist literature
Postmodernist film
Postmodern television
Parody film
Satire (film and television)
Retro style
Vaporwave
Synthwave
History of animation
Cinephilia
Mystery Science Theater 3000-Cult TV series that rely on well-known and/or obscure pop culture references as humor

External links
 Pop Culture References Books

References

Speculative fiction
Genres
Popular culture
Nerd culture
Satire
Literary genres
Metafiction
 
 
1980s in literature
1990s in literature
2000s in literature
2010s in literature
1970s in film
1980s in film
1990s in film
2000s in film
2010s in film